Greatest Hits is a compilation album from New York City alternative rock group Luscious Jackson, released on the Capitol label on Feb 20, 2007 (see 2007 in music).  Released by Capitol, only one of the tracks from their Grand Royal debut EP, In Search of Manny, made the cut.

The album was released seven years after the breakup of the band and on the same day as Jill Cunniff's solo debut, City Beach.

Track listing

References 

2007 greatest hits albums
Grand Royal compilation albums
Luscious Jackson albums